CorbaScript is an object-oriented scripting language designed for use with CORBA.

External links
The CorbaScript Language
CORBA Scripting joint revised submission
Regular Expressions: Manage CORBA with scripting ITworld
IDLScript/CorbaScript Tutorial by Christophe Gransart

Object-oriented programming languages
Scripting languages